Dastana (also Romanized as Dastanā; also known as Dasht-e Taneh, Dasht-i-Tana, Dast-e Nā, and Dastnā’) is a city in the Central District of Kiar County, Chaharmahal and Bakhtiari province, Iran. At the 2006 census, its population was 5,111 in 1,345 households, when it was a village in Shahrekord County. The following census in 2011 counted 5,199 people in 1,577 households, by which time the village was elevated to city status within the newly established Kiar County. The latest census in 2016 showed a population of 5,143 people in 1,615 households. The city is populated by Lurs.

References 

Kiar County

Cities in Chaharmahal and Bakhtiari Province

Populated places in Chaharmahal and Bakhtiari Province

Populated places in Kiar County

Luri settlements in Chaharmahal and Bakhtiari Province